Fida (translation: Infatuated) is a 2004 Indian romantic thriller film released on 20 August 2004. The film is directed by Ken Ghosh and stars Fardeen Khan, Kareena Kapoor and Shahid Kapoor. The film was a box office bomb.

Plot
Somebody empties the bank accounts of many people, including Babu Anna, an underworld don, via an Internet theft. The police are clueless about the robber, and Anna wants revenge. In another story, Jai Malhotra lives with his best friend, Sonia. He meets Neha Mehra and falls in love with her instantly. At first, Neha rejects Jai, causing him to attempt suicide. After Sonia chastises Neha regarding Jai's actions, she then falls for him too.

One day, Jai sees Neha trying to hang herself after getting a phone call. She tells him that her dead father owed a huge amount of money to Babu Anna's underworld. To repay the amount, he became part of a gang of hackers who were responsible for Internet thefts. After his death, Babu's Anna underworld began pursuing Neha to recover the money. Jai and Neha try to sell their apartments to get enough money, to no avail. A visit from a client leads Jai to consider robbing a bank to get the necessary money. At a bank, Jai spots a rich man named Vikram Singh withdrawing a huge sum of money and instead decides to steal from him. However, Vikram catches Jai during his attempts to break into his house.

Instead of reporting Jai to the police, Vikram demands an explanation for his actions. Upon learning the whole story, Vikram reveals that he is the hacker behind the internet thefts but agrees to help Jai. In return, Jai has to take the blame for the thefts. Jai agrees, gives the money to Neha and turns himself in. Jai is escorted by police to be introduced for the trial, but Anna has his men intercept them to kidnap Jai. A shootout results between the gang and police as Jai is able to escape and runs to Neha's apartment, only to find both Neha and Vikram waiting for him. He is horrified to learn that they conspired against him to steal all the money, and Neha's love was just a ruse to con him to take a fall.

Jai escapes from the apartment but is shot off in the train by a police officer. Jai falls down the river on the railway bridge Jai river drowning even though his body is not found, he is presumed dead. Two months later, Neha and Vikram start getting anonymous phone calls. Neha believes that the calls are from Jai and that he is still alive. Jai, who is very much alive, is bent on getting revenge on both Neha and Vikram.
He Stays at Sonia's place and reveals how he escaped from the river and entered a ship and was in for 2 months conspiring how to make Neha and Vikram's life hell.

Jai makes life miserable for both Vikram and Neha. One day when Neha and Vikram go out for a movie, Vikram finds Neha hanging by her neck in the toilet, and Neha confirms that Jai is alive. Vikram, out of rage, tracks Jai down and severely beats him up, threatening to murder him if he comes back into their lives again. Vikram then reports Jai to Babu Anna, thus giving him a whiff of the affair. This does not deter Jai as he later blackmails Vikram by kidnapping Neha, forcing him to turn himself in. Vikram obliges and is led to Neha; however, all three are intercepted and taken hostage by Babu Anna and his gang, demanding all his money from them. Jai cleverly deflects Anna and forces Vikram to transfer Anna's money back into his account. Catching them off guard, Jai and Vikram finish Anna and his gang.

In the melee, Vikram has Jai cornered, but Jai finally overpowers him. However, Neha strikes Jai hard from behind, allowing Vikram to gun Jai down. Vikram and Neha mock Jai as they watch him struggle with his fatal injuries. Jai stuns the two by rising with Babu Anna's gun and shoots Neha in the forehead, killing her instantly, to Vikram's horror. Jai collapses and boasts about settling the score for once whilst finally succumbing to his injuries, leaving Vikram alone to grieve over Neha's corpse. Later, a news report reveals that somebody has made a very hefty and generous donation to the Missionary Charity Fund, whilst Vikram is shown heading out in a boat. Thus it is implied that Vikram gave away all of Babu Anna's money to charity as he no longer has any good use for it.

Cast
Fardeen Khan as Vikram Singh 
Kareena Kapoor as Neha Mehra
Shahid Kapoor as Jai Malhotra
Kim Sharma as Sonia Mukherjee
Akhilendra Mishra as Babu Anna
Viju Khote as a Potential buyer
Dinesh Hingoo as a Real estate agent
Vivek Vaswani as a Bank employee

Music 
The soundtrack was composed by Anu Malik. Lyrics were by Sameer. Kareena Kapoor and Shahid Kapoor lent their voices for the track "Aaja Ve Maahi" (Ek Main Hoon). Singer Alisha Chinoy lent her voice for the popular number " Maine Jisko Chaha". 
The soundtrack was very popular, and the song "Nazar Nazar" was a chartbuster sung by Udit Narayan . According to the Indian trade website Box Office India, with around 14,00,000 units sold, this film's soundtrack album was the year's tenth highest-selling.

Critical reception
Taran Adarsh of Bollywood Hungama gave the film 2 out of 5 stars, writing "On the whole, FIDA has thrilling moments, but not enough to entice you completely. At the box-office, the film will find the going tough after the initial euphoria settles. Mainly a big city film, its prospects should be better at multiplexes." Anupama Chopra writing for India Today stated "Eventually, the novelty palls and the plot plods: the climax, in which Kareena is hanging from a bell, is both dated and ridiculous."

Shilpa Bharatan-Iyer of Rediff.com gave the film a positive review, writing "Fida has its share of incongruities. But having said that, let me add Fida is definitely paisa vasool! (a common Hindi phrase meaning "value for money")."

References

External links
 
 

2004 films
2000s Hindi-language films
2000s Urdu-language films
Indian romantic thriller films
Films scored by Anu Malik
2000s romantic thriller films